Marco Gallozzi (born 27 July 1988) is an Italian professional footballer who plays midfielder for Reggina Calcio.

Career
He grew up in the youth system of Frosinone and Ascoli. In 2008, he moved to Gubbio in the Seconda Divisione. In 2011, he moved on loan to Serie A club Chievo Verona, but was only available as a substitute for 3 matches and never made any appearances. He moved to Reggina in January 2015.

External links
 Profile at Legaseriea.it 
 Profile at Gazzetta.it 
 Profile at Football.it 

1988 births
Living people
People from Frosinone
Italian footballers
Calcio Padova players
A.C. ChievoVerona players
Serie A players
Serie B players
Association football midfielders
Footballers from Lazio
Sportspeople from the Province of Frosinone